The Big Snowy Mountains are a small mountain range south of Lewistown in Fergus County, Montana. Considerably east of and isolated from the main crest of the Northern Rockies, they are one of the few points of significant elevation in the immediate area and are considered one of Montana's island ranges. The smaller Little Snowy Mountains are a contiguous range immediately to the east.

About 112,000 acres of the Big Snowies are roadless, the bulk of this on the Lewis and Clark National Forest, as well as 6,870 acres in the Twin Coulees Wilderness Study Area on adjacent BLM land; 98,000 acres of the National Forest land are also a Wilderness Study Area. The Big Snowies feature a long, relatively level east-west summit ridge, rising above timberline, that culminates in Greathouse Peak, the highest point in the range. On a clear day the view from the top of Greathouse Peak extends from Canada to Yellowstone. A number of caves, some unexplored, exist on the west end of the range, including the frozen-walled Ice Cave, which is often up to 40 degrees cooler than outside summer temperatures.

The dominant tree species include ponderosa pine, douglas-fir, and subalpine fir on the heavily forested north slope, while the south slope is drier. Wildlife includes rattlesnakes and pronghorn on the grass-covered lower elevations and deer and black bear higher up.

See also
 List of mountain ranges in Montana

Notes

External links

Mountain ranges of Montana
Landforms of Fergus County, Montana